HD 187734 is double star in the equatorial constellation of Aquila. The primary is a magnitude 6.6 giant star, while the companion is a magnitude 9.4 A-type main sequence star. As of 2014, the pair had an angular separation of 5″ along a position angle of 99°.

References

External links
 HIC 97709
 Image HD 187734
 CCDM 19514+0405

Aquila (constellation)
187734
Double stars
K-type giants
A-type main-sequence stars
097709
Durchmusterung objects